Maine School Administrative District 45 is a public school district in the U.S. state of Maine. It encompasses the rural Aroostook County towns of Washburn, Wade, and Perham. Two schools operate in the district, David J Lyon Washburn District Elementary School, and Washburn District High School.

External links
Official website

45
Education in Aroostook County, Maine